Higgi is a  derogatory word which means grasshopper as acclaimed by the nkaffa people, which according to them was an insult. The Nkaffa man wants to rewrite the history of the Dakwa people by saying this without consultation to gain relevance. According to the nkaffa people, dakwa is originally called Tsekumo, which is a fallacy, while dakwa is of Nkafa dialect from Ndakwe trying to show that the Nkaffa man existed before the Dakwa people. Literally cul-de-sac. Their other name Bazza is of Margi origin pazza named after the mountain of Bwazza,  but in documentation was written Bazza by the missionaries. The history of Michika was documented by the first missionaries that brought the Christain religion to the Highi people and they first settled at Bazza.  Michika received the CBM lately and Ziragapa came as a missionary 20 years after wards. The issue of having similar people of Bazza as a tribe and language at Mayobani Local Government Area in Adamawa State of Nigeria and that, The language has 2 dialects with two major dialects of Aghummu and Kamo is also a fallacy. However, this assertion is a fallacy as the Ndakwa people has no close association with the people of Mayobani. Although the people of the dialects are mixed, higgi are predominantly in Bazza South and Madzi West State Development Areas, as claimed by the group clamoring for kamwe. In the history of Nigeria the only tribe found and gazetted in Michika local government area are the Highi people. and the latter in Dakota North and Tsekumo Central Development Areas. Minor dialects are in various localities across the Development Areas. A significant number of Bazza  Highi people live in other parts of Nigeria and beyond (diaspora). In cosmopolitan cities and towns in Michika Local Government Area, Highi people live with members of other tribes, Such as the Marghi’s, Gra and Fulani. 

The word Highi is never and will never be derogatory as claimed by the Nkaffa dialect. There has never been any substantive record or written documents to back up this claim or assertion. The people of Bazza have never for once rejected the name Highi and no person or group from Bazza ever opted for kamwe as to how to be addressed as a people. The name 'Kamwe' address the Nkaffa dialect meaning people of the mountain and not brotherhood.   This name has, since its inception been rejected by majority of the people in Michika as it is of Nkafa origin who are the minority among all the dialects in Michika local government area.  The Nkaffa wants to politically dominate the other dialects thus leading to marginalization of other 6 dialects of the Highi tribes or dialects. Other dialects like Dakwa will translate 'mountain dwellers' as A'ghumo and it is same with the remaining dialects. From generations to generation there has never been kamwe as a tribe or group of persons known in the history of Michika and Nigeria as a whole. Even before independence of Nigeria, the original gazette till this day is Highi. The Highi tribe of Michika live side by side with the Marghi people. Attempts were made to find out if actually the name ‘Highi’ was imposed on the people by the Marghi speaking group, but even to them (Marghi) it sound strange which according to their elders  was a story or fabrication insinuated by the Nkaffa people that wants relevance to subdue the other dialects in Michika local government area. It will be of interest to note that, the kamwe name came up and became an issue of debate since 2005 but it has been an underground movement since 1982 by some few students from Michika local government area studying at Ahmadu Bello university Zaria. . The Highi people were the second largest ethnic group in the north eastern region going by 1961 senses ( nation achieve document) . All those that occupied high positions in government never registered themselves as kamwe, but Highi, notably: 
1. Late Honorable  Marmoni Lawan Bazza( former Ambassador to Saudi Arabia
2. Umaru Jaringol (former commissioner for information North eastern State)
3. Barrister David Barau ( former Deputy Governor Gongola State)
4. His Excellency retired general Buba Marwa 2 times Governor Borno and Lagos states.
5. His Excellency late Abubakar Sale Michika former executive Governor Adamawa State
6. His Excellency Mr Boni Haruna former executive Governor Adamawa State
7. Honorable Binta Masi Garba first female senator Adamawa North 
8. General Nzarwa rtd former GOC Nigeria Army 
9. Professor Basir Lawan Bazza
10. Yahaya Hama'adama Bazza, former Controller of Customs
11. Mr. Daniel Goji Wangera, rtd comptroller of prisons
12. Blame Vantue, first executive chairman  Michika local government area and host of others.

To be precise, the name kamwe is apolitical in nature which came up as far back as 1982 from Ahmadu Bello university Zaria campus by some few students from Michika local government area that are below the ages of 40 years then trying to rewrite the history of their grand fathers negatively for political gains and recognition which they never and will never get from the generality of the Highi people. It's worth noting that, it is only the Nkaffa sects that answer or pronounce kamwe. The majority of the other dialects do not e.g Kafwe pronunciation is  ka’ghummo, the Dakwa pronunciation is Aghma, likewise the people of Zah district. There has never been a referendum where Highi people came together to agree or disagree on either to use Highi or kamwe. There was no official gazette about kamwe anywhere in the whole of Nigeria or anywhere the whole of Africa and the world at large. If actually we transcendent from Ethiopia, then to Egypt,  Niger then Chad and finally Nigeria to where we found ourselves now. So, by what name were we traced and addressed then, if Kamwe is surfacing now after more than 500000 years.  Therefore as a Point of correction,  no Dakwa indigin ever and will ever say that, the name Highi is derogatory. This is a fallacy,  misleading and idiotic in all ramifications. Dakwa was never known and referred to as Tsukmo. To put history correct, Dakwa which is presently known as Bazza is made up of the following as wards. 1. Tsukmo / Tilijo ward encompassing Tilijo (Dlilie) wastila, whabaghi, wumu, Dlichimi, kudzumu, Shikagana and Tsukmo Central. 2. Bazza marghi ward made up of the following villages: Ldaba, Mokula,  fwa, Biang,  lthumcheri,  kija, Muvula and Ghumtka. Then 3. Jigalambu ward Thai is made up of the following: Ldapelle,  Pulu,  Tudunwada (Biri), Faluwa,  kankila,  Ghumurmadzu,  then Jigalambu. The so acclaimed Kamwe agitators are distorting history and are trying to mislead the young ones. This is so as majority of our children in tertiary institutions are confused and divided instead of being United. This kamwe is seriously a dragon that is ready to distract us and make Michika divided instead of unity that will Foster Development. If kamue means people of the mountain, does it mean that: the Gra, Matakam, Ngoshe, Maffa, Wulla, Kurghe,  Mujulu,  Sukur,  Fali, Gude,  Njenyi,  and other tribes occupying a vast portion of the Mandara mountains up to Mambilla plateau in Taraba State are also part of kamwe in Michika? What a myopic thinking and ignorance? It would have been better if the Nkaffa people as an entity say they are a group of Michika indigenes that for purposes of recognition wants to be addressee as kamwe because majority of their people are still on the mountain tops, but not to impose same on the generality of Michika local government area.  Let the world know this hence forth that there is no ethnic group in Michika local government area  known as kamwe but Highi.
Ethnic groups in Nigeria
Tribes of Africa